The 2017 Qatar Open (also known as 2017 Qatar ExxonMobil Open for sponsorship reasons) was a men's tennis tournament played on outdoor hard courts. It was the 25th edition of the Qatar Open, and part of the ATP World Tour 250 series of the 2017 ATP World Tour. It took place at the Khalifa International Tennis and Squash Complex in Doha, Qatar, from January 2–7.

Points and prize money

Point distribution

Prize money

Singles main-draw entrants

Seeds

1 Rankings as of December 26, 2016

Other entrants
The following players received wildcards into the singles main draw:
  Arthur De Greef
  Anıl Yüksel
  Mubarak Shannan Zayid

The following players received entry from the qualifying draw:
  Alessandro Giannessi
  Vasek Pospisil 
  Mohamed Safwat
  Radek Štěpánek

Doubles main-draw entrants

Seeds

1 Rankings as of December 26, 2016

Other entrants
The following pairs received wildcards into the doubles main draw:
   Malek Jaziri /  Mubarak Shannan Zayid
   Jabor Al-Mutawa /  Mousa Shanan Zayed

Champions

Singles 

  Novak Djokovic def.  Andy Murray, 6–3, 5–7, 6–4

Doubles 

   Jérémy Chardy /  Fabrice Martin def.  Vasek Pospisil /  Radek Štěpánek, 6–4, 7–6(7–3)

External links